Chilo orichalcociliella is a moth in the family Crambidae. It was described by Strand in 1911. It is found in Ghana, Kenya, Madagascar, Malawi, Mozambique, South Africa and Tanzania.

The larvae have been recorded feeding on Zea mays and Sorghum species.

References

Chiloini
Moths described in 1911
Moths of Sub-Saharan Africa